The Colored Radical was an African American newspaper in Kansas. It was the first black newspaper in the state and was published in Lawrence and Leavenworth for just under three months in 1876. The paper supported the Kansas Republican Party during the that year's elections, argued against racial segregation, and reported on lynchings like the Hamburg massacre in Hamburg, South Carolina. Following the conclusion of the elections, the paper dissolved, and only five of its fourteen issues are extant.

Publication and contents 

The Colored Radical was the first black newspaper in the state of Kansas, published jointly in Lawrence and Leavenworth. T. W. Henderson and A. T. Williams were its editors, both of them black ministers. It was first published on August 24, 1876, in the aftermath of the Emancipation Proclamation and the subsequent flight of black people out of the American South into Kansas. A subscription to the paper cost $0.50, and it was produced by the same printers as the Kansas Daily Tribune.

It was a mouthpiece for the Kansas Republican Party in the 1876 United States elections. Its reporting base was wide geographically; as far south and east as Mississippi provided it with information. It was staunchly anti-segregation, criticizing the existence of a bipartite educational system, where white and black children would attend separate schools. It called the lynching in Hamburg, South Carolina—dubbed the Hamburg massacre—one of the "darkest chapters in American society". Although it was at times critical in tone, it also provided optimistic news for black Kansans, and urged them to become self-reliant through property acquisitions and maintenance.

The last issue of the paper was published on November 16, 1876, shortly after the elections concluded. Two years following its closure, W. L. Eagleson established a black newspaper in Fort Scott, then later Topeka, called the Colored Citizen. Henderson joined Eagleson in editing that paper. Of the fourteen issues of the Colored Radical, only five survive.

Notes and references

Notes

Citations

Bibliography

 
 
 
  Published following the 1908 Clifton Conference, attended by officials from several black colleges and universities.

1876 disestablishments in Kansas
1876 establishments in Kansas
African-American history of Kansas
African-American newspapers
Defunct newspapers published in Kansas